Plainfield Country Club is a private country club and golf course located in Edison in Middlesex County, New Jersey, United States. It was founded in 1890 as the Hillside Tennis Club. Its golf course was designed in 1916 by golf course designer Donald Ross, and opened BC for play in 1921.

Handicap system

In 1904, Leighton Calkins—who served as the mayor of Plainfield, New Jersey, from 1915 through 1920—created the handicap system currently used in golf today. In honor of Calkins, a set of tees at the Plainfield Country Club bears his name.

Later history
Plainfield Country Club has been home to the 1978 U.S. Amateur, the 1987 U.S. Women's Open, several state and regional championships, and has been ranked among the best in the country. In 2011, it was home to The Barclays golf tournament, the first PGA Tour FedEx Cup playoff event. In August 2015, Plainfield Country Club again hosted the Barclays PGA golf tournament.

References

External links

1890 establishments in New Jersey
Edison, New Jersey
Golf clubs and courses designed by Donald Ross
Golf clubs and courses in New Jersey
Buildings and structures in Middlesex County, New Jersey